ISGEC Heavy Engineering Ltd (formerly known as Indian Sugar and General Engineering Corporation) is an Indian heavy engineering company. It was ranked 252 in the ET 2021 listing, and 253 in the Fortune India 500 Listings.

The company deals with process equipment, EPC projects, industrial boilers, sugar plants and distilleries, mechanical and hydraulic presses, steel and iron castings, air pollution control equipment and contract manufacturing.

The company has its manufacturing plants and design offices spread across India; in Haryana, Uttar Pradesh, Gujarat, Tamil Nadu and Maharashtra.

History
ISGEC originated from Saraswati Sugar Mills established in 1933, with a sugarcane crushing capacity of 400 tonnes per day. It has grown into one of India's largest sugar mills and now crushes 13,000 tonnes per day. It is today a subsidiary company. At the time of the nation's independence, the need for an Indian capital goods industry was recognized and ISGEC was established in 1946. The initial activity was the manufacture of spares for sugar mills. In the course of its history, the company diversified into a range of engineering products. In 1964, it established a joint venture with John Thompson of the UK to form ISGEC John Thompson. In 1981, it acquired majority shares in Uttar Pradesh Steels. Both units were subsequently absorbed into the parent company. In 2011, the company name was changed from Saraswati Industrial Syndicate Ltd. to ISGEC Heavy Engineering Ltd. with all businesses consolidated and now marketed under a common brand name – ISGEC.

In 2018, the company acquired 100% stake in Eagle Press & Equipment Co. Ltd., a Press manufacturing company in Windsor (Ontario) Canada.

Operations
Isgec has its manufacturing operations across Yamunanagar, Dahej, Bawal and Muzaffarnagar, with offices in Noida, Pune, Chennai, Mumbai and Kolkata in India. Spread over 100 hectares (250 acres), the company's manufacturing facilities have a shop floor area of over 55,000 square meters (66,400 square yards) with manufacturing and testing facilities.

Export
Isgec products have been supplied to companies across 91 countries, many of whom have placed repeat orders to them. These include:
 ABB Group, Switzerland
 Siemens, Germany
 Foster Wheeler, China
 Sumitomo, Japan
 Foster Wheeler, U.S.
 Valeo, France
 GE Hydro, Canada
 Virginia Tech, U.S.
 LuK, Germany
 Wesfarmers Group, Australia

Strategic partnerships
 Amec Foster Wheeler North America Corp, U.S.  (now with Wood Group, UK) for Circulating Fluidized Bed Combustion (CFBC) Boilers up to 99.9 Mwe, Oil and Gas, Shop Assembled Water Tube Packaged Boilers up to 260 tonnes per hour, Pulverized Coal Fired Sub-Critical Boilers and Super-Critical Boilers (60 to 1000 Mwe), Feed Water Heaters and Surface Condensers and Reheat Design of CFBC Boilers up to 100 MW
 AP&T, Sweden for Press Hardening Lines used for forming of High Strength Steel Automobile Body Parts
 Babcock Power Environmental Inc, U.S. for SOx reduction process by use of Wet Flue Gas Desulfurization (FGD) Units
BHI FW Corporation, South Korea for Pulverized Coal Fired Sub-Critical Boilers and Super-Critical Boilers (60 to 1000 Mwe)
 CB&I Technology Inc., U.S. for Helix Heat Exchangers
 Envirotherm GmbH, Germany for reduction of Particulate Matter emissions by use of Electrostatic Precipitators performance improvement technologies (especially Flue Gas Conditioning) and NOx reduction processes by use of Urea or Ammonia (SNCR)
 Fuel Tech Inc., U.S. for reduction of Particulate Matter emissions by use of Electrostatic Precipitators performance improvement technologies (especially Flue Gas Conditioning) and NOx reduction processes by use of Urea or Ammonia (SNCR)
Siemens Heat Transfer Technology b.v., Netherlands for Heat Recovery Steam Generators
Sumitomo SHI FW Energia Oy, Finland for Circulating Fluidized Bed Combustion (CFBC) Boilers up to 99.9 Mwe, Oil and Gas, Shop Assembled Water Tube Packaged Boilers up to 260 tonnes per hour, and Semi Dry Flue Gas Desulphurisation (FGD) Systems (Circulating Dry Scrubber Technology) for Unit sizes of 50 MWe and above
 Thermal Engineering International (TEi), U.S. for Screw Plug (Breech Lock) Heat Exchangers and Waste Heat Recovery through Process Waste Heat Boilers, Sulphur Condensers and Solar Thermal Heat Exchangers
source:

Quality, safety and environment
Over a period of eight decades, Isgec has been accredited by various standards organisations:
 ISO 9001:2008 Approval by Lloyd's Register of Quality Assurance

Joint ventures
Isgec Heavy Engineering Limited, India and Hitachi Zosen Corporation, Japan have a joint venture – Isgec Hitachi Zosen Ltd. – for manufacturing specialized and critical process equipment. The new company has a shareholding pattern of 51% (Isgec) to 49% (Hitachi Zosen Corp.).
A Joint Venture Company along with Amec Foster Wheeler North America Corp., U.S.A has been incorporated in the name of "Isgec Foster Wheeler Boilers" with a paid up capital of Rupees Two crore only.
Isgec and TITAN Metal Fabricators create joint venture manufacturing operation.
Isgec Heavy Engineering has formed a joint venture with Italy-based Redecam Group SpA.

References 

Manufacturing companies based in Noida
Engineering companies of India
Indian companies established in 1933
Manufacturing companies established in 1933
Companies listed on the Bombay Stock Exchange